Alexander Kostritsyn (born 1986) is a Russian professional poker player considered among the best online cash game players in the world. Kostritsyn plays under the alias joiso on PokerStars and PostflopAction on Full Tilt Poker.

In 2010, Kostritsyn won Event No. 9 at the PokerStars World Championship of Online Poker for $269,284. Kostritsyn described winning $2.7 million online in 2013 as not a big winning streak for the stakes being played.

Kostritsyn won the 2008 Aussie Millions Main Event for $1,450,396 defeating eight-time WSOP bracelet winner Erik Seidel heads up. As of 2015, his total live tournament winnings exceed $3,000,000.

References

1986 births
Russian poker players
American poker players
Living people